Alberto Sughi (October 5, 1928 – March 31, 2012) was an Italian painter.

Biography
Sughi was born in Cesena, Emilia-Romagna.

A self-taught painter, by the end of his formative years he had become one of the greatest Italian artists of his generation. He started painting in the early 1950s, choosing realism in the debate between abstract and figurative art in the immediate post-war period. Even from his early works, however, Sughi’s paintings have avoided any attempt at social moralising. They depict moments from daily life with no heroes, allowing Enrico Crispolti, in 1956, to define his work as "existential realism". His artistic expression proceeds, almost always, in thematic cycles, in the manner of film sequences. First of all, there were his so-called "green paintings", devoted to the relationship between man and nature (1971–1973), then the Supper cycle (1975–1976), after that the 20 paintings and fifteen studies of Imagination and Memory of the Family, dating from the early 1980s; the series Evening or reflection started from 1985. His most recent series of large canvases, exhibited in 2000, is entitled Nocturnal.

Sughi has taken part in all the most important collective exhibitions of contemporary art, from the International Biennale art exhibition in Venice to the Quadriennale in Rome, as well as various exhibitions that have been held abroad, charting the history of Italian art from the 1970s until today. Italian and foreign museums have held large retrospective exhibitions; among the most significant are the Gallery of Modern Art in Bologna (1977), the Manezh Gallery in Moscow (1978), the Museum of Castel Sant'Angelo in Rome, the Fine Arts Museum in Budapest and the National Gallery in Prague (1986), the Civic Modern Art Gallery in Ferrara (1988), the Casa Masaccio in San Giovanni Valdarno (1990), the Assis Chateaubriand Art Gallery in São Paulo in Brazil (1994) and the Civic Museum of San Sepolcro (2003). The artist has taken part in the cycle of exhibitions entitled The search for identity in Cagliari, Palermo and Ascoli Piceno (2003–2004), the exhibition Evil. Exercises in cruel painting at the Hunting Lodge of Stupinigi, in Turin (2005), and the exhibition "Intimate Portraits from Lotto to Pirandello", at the Regional Archaeological Museum in Aosta (2005) .

In 1994, Alberto Sughi was appointed director of the Ente Quadriennale Nazionale d' Arte in Rome.

At the end of 2005 and until 21 January 2006, a large retrospective exhibition of Sughi’s work was held at the Palazzo della Pilotta in Parma. The exhibition contained 642 works, including paintings, tempera, drawings, and lithographs, made between 1959 and 2004, and owned by the collections of the Centro Studi ed Archivio della Comunicazione (CSAC) at the University of Parma, including the painting Rimmel, made in 2004. 
In April and May 2006, the modern art gallery in Arezzo held the exhibition il Segno e l'Immagine, consisting of 50 works (all made on paper and then applied to canvas) painted in 2005 and 2006. 
2007 has seen two new major Alberto Sughi's solo exhibitions, the first hold in the new rooms of the Biblioteca Malatestiana di Cesena, the second in the Complesso Vittoriano, Rome.
In May 2009 Alberto Sughi had a new large retrospective this time in Palazzo Sant'Elia, Palermo, Sicily. The exhibition presented a group of ninety paintings, both from public and private collections. The exhibition catalogue featured a long essay "Dove va l'uomo" ("Where man goes") by the exhibition curator Professor Maurizio Calvesi. In September 2009 the same exhibition was shown at the Italian Institute of Culture in London.

In 2011 Alberto Sughi's work Un mondo di freddo e di ghiaccio (A world of cold and of ice), Oil on canvas, 140x160cm, 2011, has been selected for the 54th Venice Biennale, Padiglione Italia. The painting (reproduced here below) will be presented to the public at the Italian Pavilion, in Venice, when the Biennale will open on 4 June 2011.

Alberto Sughi, Un mondo di freddo e di ghiaccio (2011)

Yoshihiko Wada Plagiarism 

In May 2006, news emerged that the prize-winning Japanese artist, Yoshihiko Wada (aged 66) 
had been accused of plagiarizing the work of Alberto Sughi (aged 77), having produced several pieces of art virtually identical to pieces from Sughi. The story made national news in Japan. Several pieces of art on exhibition which bear striking similarities to Sughi's works had helped Wada win the Education, Science and Technology Minister's Art Encouragement Prize in March. However, in April the Japan Artists Association and Agency for Cultural Affairs received an anonymous tip-off questioning the authenticity of Wada's work sparking an investigation into the allegations of plagiarism.

Wada denies the plagiarism claims, and stated that he had known Sughi ever since he studied in Italy in the 1970s, and had received artistic influence from Sughi whilst doing study and design work together with him. Wada claims he had painted with Sughi "in collaboration" and therefore the paintings are not plagiarised. Wada told the Japanese newspaper Yomiuri Shimbun he had known Sughi for 40 years and they had drawn together and exchanged opinions. He says the paintings were created as an homage to Sughi and that he had made it clear when exhibiting the works.

Sughi said he was unaware of the existence of the similar paintings until he was contacted by the Japanese embassy in Italy in early May. According to Sughi, Wada had introduced himself as a great fan of his work and had visited his gallery as many as five times taking photos of his works from different angles. Sughi did not know Wada was also an artist and had only thought Wada was a fan of his paintings. Sughi expressed shock at finding out about Wada's works and is considering filing a criminal complaint and damage suit against Wada for plagiarism. Sughi claims that over 30 of Wada's paintings bore an uncanny resemblance to his work and had suggested that the best way to clarify the truth would be to hold an exhibition of his work alongside Wada's. He also expressed that the award Wada had received should be rescinded.

Three of the seven screening judges that decided to award Wada with the art recommendation prize attended a special review meeting. The panel examined the investigation reports, statements, and pictorial records from Wada and Sughi, with a focus on Wada's "Drama and Poesie" memoir exhibition, which was the basis for his prize. They concluded that there was insufficient evidence to assume Wada's works were not stolen. The Agency for Cultural Affairs also concluded that several of Wada's works appeared to be plagiarised and decided on Monday (June 5) to strip Wada of the prize he won. This would be the first time since the award was set up in 1950 that an artist was stripped of the award.

References

External links

www.albertosughi.com

1928 births
2012 deaths
People from Cesena
20th-century Italian painters
Italian male painters
Italian contemporary artists
21st-century Italian painters
Modern painters
20th-century Italian male artists
21st-century Italian male artists